Pat Davies (born  1955) is an English former footballer who played for England against Scotland on 18 November 1972, scoring two goals to complete England's 3–2 victory.

She scored a hat-trick for Southampton Women's F.C. in their 4–1 victory over Stewarton Thistle in the final of the first Women's FA Cup in 1971.

She retired from playing in 1978 after becoming disillusioned with the lack of development in English women's football.

Honours
 Southampton
 FA Women's Cup: 1970–71, 1974–75, 1977–78

References

External links
 Includes photo of Davies

Year of birth missing (living people)
Living people
England women's international footballers
Southampton Women's F.C. players
People from Netley
Women's association football forwards
English women's footballers